Chief of the Naval Staff is the formal title for the office of:

 Chief of Naval Operations, United States Navy
 Chief of Naval Staff (Bangladesh)
 Chief of Naval Staff (Ghana)
 Chief of Naval Staff (Nigeria)
 Chief of Naval Staff (Pakistan)
 Chief of the Naval Staff (Sweden)
 Chief of Navy (Australia)
 Chief of Navy (New Zealand)
 Chief of Staff of the French Navy
 Chief of Staff of the Indonesian Navy
 Chief of the Naval Staff (India)
 Commander of the Royal Canadian Navy
 First Sea Lord and Chief of the Naval Staff

See also
 Chief of Army Staff (disambiguation)
 Chief of Navy (disambiguation)
 Chief of Staff of the Navy (disambiguation)
 Chief of the Air Staff (disambiguation)
 Chief of the Defence Staff (disambiguation)
 Chief of the General Staff